The fourteenth season of The Real Housewives of Atlanta, an American reality television series, is broadcast on Bravo, it premiered on May 1, 2022, and is primarily filmed in Atlanta, Georgia. Its executive producers are Steven Weinstock, Glenda Hersh, Lauren Eskelin, Lorraine Haughton-Lawson, Luke Neslage, Glenda Cox, Joye Chin, and Andy Cohen.

The Real Housewives of Atlanta focuses on the lives of Shereé Whitfield, Kandi Burruss, Kenya Moore, Drew Sidora,    Marlo Hampton, and Sanya Richards-Ross.

Cast
For the fourteenth season, three of the five cast members from the previous season returned. Long-running housewives, Cynthia Bailey and Porsha Williams announced their departures from the series in September 2021. Kandi Burruss, Kenya Moore, and Drew Sidora returned, along with Marlo Hampton being promoted to a full-time cast member. 

Shereé Whitfield also returned to the series for a third time, after her last appearance in the show's tenth season. Additionally, four-time Olympic gold medalist in track and field, mom, wife, and businesswoman, Sanya Richards-Ross joined the cast as a Housewife, while Monyetta Shaw-Carter is introduced as a "friend of the housewives" through her connection with Burruss.  

Original cast members, DeShawn Snow and Lisa Wu, returned as guests throughout the season, along with Fatum Alford being introduced as a guest through her connection with Whitfield.

Taglines 

Kandi: "I ain't never skipped a beat or a bag."

Drew: "I keep you on the edges of your seat."

Marlo: "I always had the juice, but now I've got the peach."

Kenya: "You're always living in the moment when you are the moment."

Shereé: "Spring, Summer, or September, I'm the one you always remember."

Sanya: "I may be a rookie, but this isn't my first race."

Production 
Production for the season began in October 2021 and concluded the following year in February 2022. The first trailer was released on March 30, 2022.

Episodes

References

External links
 

 

2022 American television seasons
Atlanta (season 14)